Samuel Colcord Bartlett (November25, 1817November16, 1898) was an American Congregational minister who served as the 8th president of Dartmouth College from 18771892. He graduated from Dartmouth with the Class of 1836.

Biography
Another period of growth for Dartmouth College marked the tenure of President Bartlett, with the building of Rollins Chapel, Bartlett Hall and Wilson Hall. An elective course for students took shape during his administration and the endowment surpassed the million-dollar mark. Bartlett improved working conditions for faculty members and added 30 more scholarships to what had been an already growing list during the tenure of President Lord.

But the administration of President Bartlett was an embattled one, and he lost the vital support of faculty and alumni alike. The controversy surrounding him reached an apogee when the majority of the graduating Class of 1881 called for his removal from office. Subjected to an investigation by the Trustees, Bartlett employed what had become a legendary wit and finely honed intelligence to explain his actions and defend his administration. As a result, the charges—that he had alienated the faculty, ignored important administrative duties and generally conducted himself in a way unbecoming a Dartmouth president--"melted away," in the words of one chronicler. President Bartlett remained in office until 1892, when he resigned to become a member of the faculty.

Works

Samuel C. Bartlett, 1879, From Egypt to Palestine: through Sinai, the wilderness and the south country 
 Samuel C. Bartlett, 1882, Sources of history in the Pentateuch : six lectures delivered in Princeton theological seminary, on the Stone foundation
 Samuel C. Bartlett, 1880, The Princeton Review, pp.23-56, The Inspiration of the New Testament
 Samuel C. Bartlett, 1897, The Veracity of the Hexateuch
 Samuel C. Bartlett, 1872, The Divine Forces of the Gospel: A Sermon ...
 Samuel C. Bartlett, 1850, The Moral Relations of Physical Science
 Samuel C. Bartlett, 1856, Lectures on Modern Universalism

External links
Article posted with permission from Dartmouth College
The Papers of Fanny and Samuel Concord Bartlett Jr. at Dartmouth College Library

1817 births
1898 deaths
Dartmouth College alumni
Pinkerton Academy alumni
Presidents of Dartmouth College